Hard (stylised in all caps) is the fourth studio album by Swedish singer Tove Styrke. It was released on 3 June 2022 by Sony Music.

Release and promotion
"Start Walking" was released as the album's lead single on 22 October 2021. The second single "Show Me Love" followed on 21 January 2022. "Hardcore" was released as the third single on 11 March 2022, and "YouYouYou" was released as the fourth single on 6 May 2022.

Hard was released on 3 June 2022. Originally released with nine tracks, the album's track listing was updated twice: "Cool Me Down" was added on 10 June 2022 and "Another Broken Heart" on 2 September 2022. The latter was sent to radio on 9 September 2022.

Reception
Hard received generally positive reviews by music critics. Stephen Daw of Billboard regarded the album "stunning", writing that Styrke "exudes confidence and pure pop bliss". Dave Russell of The Line of Best Fit praised Styrke's vocal performance throughout the record. He wrote, "Hard isn't perfect – and maybe that's part of the point – but Styrke doesn't loses sight of her sense of fun."

Track listing

Notes
"Cool Me Down" was added to the track listing on 10 June 2022.
"Another Broken Heart" was added to the track listing on 2 September 2022.

Charts

References

2022 albums
Tove Styrke albums
RCA Records albums